Keith Fenton (born June 19, 1960) is a Canadian curler.

Awards
Manitoba Sports Hall of Fame: inducted in 2002 with all of 1995 Kerry Burtnyk team, Canadian and World champions

Teams

References

External links
 
 Keith Fenton – Curling Canada Stats Archive
 Video: 

1960 births
Living people
Brier champions
Canada Cup (curling) participants
Canadian male curlers
Curlers from Winnipeg
World curling champions
21st-century Canadian people